Victoria or giant waterlily is a genus of water-lilies, in the plant family Nymphaeaceae, with very large green leaves that lie flat on the water's surface. The genus name was given in honour of Queen Victoria of the United Kingdom. It pushes other water plants aside as it spreads out until only those of its kind remains. When this happens it has completely cut out the sunlight from getting to any plants below the water. There are  typically 50 to 70 petals and  150 to 200 stamens.

Extant species

The first published description of the genus was by John Lindley in 1837, based on specimens returned from British Guiana by Robert Schomburgk. Lindley named the genus after the new Queen, Victoria, and the species Victoria regia. An earlier account of the species, Euryale amazonica Poeppig, in 1832 described an affinity with Euryale ferox. A collection and description was also made by the French botanist Aimé Bonpland in 1825.

References

External links

 Giant waterlily at the Royal Botanic Gardens, Kew

Nymphaeaceae
Aquatic plants
Flora of Guyana
Flora of the Amazon
Nymphaeales genera